Ronaldo Guiaro (born 18 February 1974) is a Brazilian professional football coach and former player who is the assistant coach of XV de Piracicaba.  As a player, he was a centre-back who began his career at Guarani and went on to spend most of his playing years in Europe, notably for Benfica and Beşiktaş.

Club career
Born in Piracicaba, São Paulo, Ronaldo started playing with Guarani, moving to Atlético Mineiro shortly after. In 1996, aged 22, he joined S.L. Benfica in Portugal, backing up Jorge Bermúdez and Hélder Cristóvão in his first season but became the club's first-choice afterwards as they failed to win any silverware.

After five seasons with Benfica, Ronaldo signed for Beşiktaş J.K. in Turkey. There, he was also an undisputed starter for the majority of his spell. In the 2002–03 season, he only missed one match in the Süper Lig as the Istanbul team won the title after eight years.

Aged 31, Ronaldo returned to his native Brazil. But two years later, he moved abroad again to join Aris Thessaloniki F.C. in the Superleague Greece as a defensive mainstay. He played for the Greek club for several seasons, helping them qualify three times to the UEFA Cup, now known as the UEFA Europa League.

International career
Ronaldo represented the bronze medal-winning Brazil squad at the 1996 Summer Olympics, playing in all matches. Another Ronaldo was also present in the squad, but he wore "Ronaldinho" (meaning "little Ronaldo") on the back of his shirt since Ronaldo was two years older than him.

Honours

Club
Atlético Mineiro
Campeonato Mineiro: 1995

Benfica
Taça de Portugal: Runner-up 1996–97

Beşiktaş
Süper Lig: 2002–03
Turkish Cup: Runner-up 2001–02

Santos
Campeonato Paulista: 2006, 2007

Aris
Greek Football Cup: Runner-up 2007–08, 2009–10

Individual
Beşiktaş J.K. Squads of Century (Silver Team)

International
Brazil
Summer Olympic Games: Bronze medal 1996

References

External links

Futpédia profile 

1974 births
Living people
People from Piracicaba
Brazilian people of Italian descent
Brazilian footballers
Brazilian football managers
Association football defenders
Campeonato Brasileiro Série A players
Guarani FC players
Clube Atlético Mineiro players
Santos FC players
Primeira Liga players
S.L. Benfica footballers
Süper Lig players
Beşiktaş J.K. footballers
Super League Greece players
Aris Thessaloniki F.C. players
Olympic footballers of Brazil
Footballers at the 1996 Summer Olympics
Olympic medalists in football
Olympic bronze medalists for Brazil
Medalists at the 1996 Summer Olympics
Brazilian expatriate footballers
Expatriate footballers in Portugal
Expatriate footballers in Turkey
Expatriate footballers in Greece
Brazilian expatriate sportspeople in Portugal
Brazilian expatriate sportspeople in Turkey
Brazilian expatriate sportspeople in Greece
Esporte Clube XV de Novembro (Piracicaba) managers
Footballers from São Paulo (state)